Güngör Kaya (born 27 April 1990) is a Turkish-German former professional footballer who plays as a forward for SV Horst 08.

Career
Kaya started his career with German Bundesliga side 1. FC Nürnberg.

References

External links
 
 

Living people
1990 births
German people of Turkish descent
Sportspeople from Gelsenkirchen
German footballers
Turkish footballers
Association football forwards
TFF First League players
TFF Second League players
TFF Third League players
Regionalliga players
1. FC Nürnberg II players
Vaasan Palloseura players
Rot-Weiss Essen players
Adanaspor footballers
Eyüpspor footballers
KFC Uerdingen 05 players
SG Wattenscheid 09 players
Rot-Weiß Oberhausen players
Fatih Karagümrük S.K. footballers
German expatriate footballers
Turkish expatriate footballers
Turkish expatriate sportspeople in Finland
German expatriate sportspeople in Finland
Expatriate footballers in Finland
German expatriate sportspeople in Turkey
Expatriate footballers in Turkey
Footballers from North Rhine-Westphalia